Blastobasis velutina is a moth in the  family Blastobasidae. It is found on the Canary Islands.

The wingspan is 11–14 mm. The forewings are ash-grey with markings consisting of black scales. The hindwings are ash-grey, shaded with black at the sides and posterior.

References

Moths described in 1908
Blastobasis